Reino Oscar Nori (February 26, 1913 – October 8, 1988) was an American football quarterback who played in the National Football League (NFL) for the Brooklyn Dodgers and Chicago Bears from 1937 to 1938.

References

External links
 

1913 births
1988 deaths

American football quarterbacks
Brooklyn Dodgers (NFL) players
Chicago Bears players
Northern Illinois Huskies football players
People from DeKalb, Illinois
Players of American football from Illinois